The Indian Gandhiyan Party (IGP) is a registered but unrecognized political party in the Indian state Kerala. The party contested seats in the 2019 Indian general election. Aashin US, National Election Coordinator of the IGP, contested Varanasi Lok Sabha Constituency against Narendra Modi in the 17th General Elections. Aashin received 504 votes with a campaign slogan "#IdevelopIndia". The party fielded candidates in 503 Lok Sabha Constituencies. Aashin's candidate application form submitted in Amethi Constituency against Rahul Gandhi but the form was rejected. IGP shortlists 543 business leaders for the 18th Lok Sabha General Election.  As a first step towards it, Aashin contested the 17th general elections.

Kerala Assembly Election

Lok Sabha (Lower House)

References

Political parties in Kerala
Gandhism
Indian nationalist political parties
Political parties with year of establishment missing